Cameron Howat (born 30 January 1985) is a former Australian rules footballer who was selected in the 2005 AFL Rookie Draft by the Richmond Football Club and delisted after the 2008 season.

After playing 20 senior games in two seasons Howat was de-listed by the Tigers on 31 October 2007. However he was reselected that same year at the 2007 AFL Rookie Draft at pick 47. He did show some promise when in the senior team, his silky skills and dashing run from defence being a treat to watch.

He played one more game in 2008 in which he was suspended for striking.  He was finally delisted from the Richmond Rookie list at the end of the 2008 season.

External links

Howat facing suspension

Richmond Football Club players
Box Hill Football Club players
Living people
1985 births
Oakleigh Chargers players
Australian rules footballers from Victoria (Australia)
Coburg Football Club players
People educated at Carey Baptist Grammar School